Craig "Junior" Miller (born December 20, 1965, in Amarillo, Texas) is an American radio personality and member of the Dunham and Miller Show, heard 5:30-10:00 AM on sports radio KTCK 1310 AM  in Dallas, Texas. Miller co-hosts the show with long-time friend and college roommate George Dunham, alongside Gordon Keith.

Miller is one of the few remaining original Ticket hosts. Miller has been co-hosting with Dunham on the station since 1994. Miller has been nominated for and received several NAB Marconi Radio Awards throughout his career.

Miller and his cohosts are the highest rated morning radio program in the Dallas-Fort Worth market.

Miller is an avid runner and cyclist and often competes in competitive cycling events and marathons.

Miller is an accomplished Actor who was part of the team that won a Primetime Emmy Award for their work on "The Jessie Owens Story", a 1984 TV Movie which is a biopic of the four-time Olympic gold medalist Jesse Owens.

References 

1965 births
Living people
Radio personalities from Dallas